Lake of the Woods is a lake occupying parts of the Canadian provinces of Ontario and Manitoba and the U.S. state of Minnesota. It is fed by the Rainy River, Shoal Lake, Kakagi Lake and other smaller rivers. The lake drains into the Winnipeg River and then into Lake Winnipeg. Ultimately, its outflow goes north through the Nelson River to Hudson Bay.

Lake of the Woods is also the sixth largest freshwater lake located (at least partially) in the United States, after the five Great Lakes, and the 36th largest lake in the world by area.  It separates a small land area of Minnesota from the rest of the United States. The Northwest Angle and the town of Angle Township can be reached from the rest of Minnesota only by crossing the lake or by traveling through Canada. The Northwest Angle is the northernmost part of the contiguous United States. Its "northwesternmost point" served as a problematic landmark in treaties defining the international border.

The lake's islands provide nesting habitats for the piping plover and large numbers of American white pelicans and as recently as the early 20th century also provided calving habitat to boreal woodland caribou. There are also several hundred nesting pairs of bald eagles in this area.

Lake of the Woods, a translation of the original French name , was so named from its wooded setting. However, it may have been a mistranslation of the Ojibwe name. "The earliest name we find the lake known by is that given by Verendrye in his journey in 1731. He says it was called Lake Minitic or Des Bois. (1) The former of these names, Minitic, seems to be Ojibwe, and to mean "Islands in a River", probably referring to the many islands found in the northern half of the lake. The other name (2) Lac des Bois, or Lake of the Woods, seems to have been a mistranslation of the Indian [sic] name (Ojibwe) by which the Lake was known." One of the names currently used in Ojibwe for this lake is  meaning "Lake with Uneven Sand" referring to the lake's sand dunes.

Governance

The construction of dams at the Lake of the Woods outlets in present-day Kenora in the late 19th century led to concerns over high and low water levels on the lake early in the 20th century. The federal governments of Canada and the United States referred the matter to the International Joint Commission (IJC) in 1912. In 1917 the IJC recommended the creation of control boards and the operating conditions they would apply to lake level management. The first of these boards, the Lake of the Woods Control Board (LWCB), was established by Canadian Order-in-Council in 1919. Two additional acts provided statutory establishment of the LWCB, defined its jurisdiction and powers, and provided for board members appointed by Canada and Ontario: the Lake of the Woods Control Board Act, Canada, 1921, the Lake of the Woods Control Board Act, Ontario, 1922. In 1922 the Canada-Ontario-Manitoba Tripartite Agreement was signed by the respective governments. Initially, only Canada and Ontario appointed members to the board as, at that time, natural resources in Manitoba were administered by Canada. In 1958, having gained control over its natural resources, Manitoba passed its own Lake of the Woods Control Board Act. That same year, Canada and Ontario amended their original versions of the acts. As a result of these legislative changes, the LWCB now has one member appointed by Canada, two appointed by Ontario, and one appointed by Manitoba.

Following the IJC recommendations of 1917, discussions between the federal governments of Canada and the United States resulted in the 1925 Canada/USA Convention and Protocol regarding Lake of the Woods. This treaty established the water level operating range on Lake of the Woods, defined the purpose and general mode of operation, and provided for two boards to control regulation. The previously established Canadian LWCB was to regulate the lake on an ongoing basis, but its decisions were to be subject to approval by an International Lake of the Woods Control Board (ILWCB) whenever lake levels rose above or fell below certain limits. In cases where agreement could not be reached between Canadian and American members of the international board, the disputed matter would be referred to the IJC for the final decision. The International Lake of the Woods Control Board, however, is not a board created by the IJC. The board's members (one American and one Canadian) are appointed by the respective federal governments. Notably, at no point in this process were local Ojibwe populations consulted, despite the environmental impacts of the dams on nearby communities on the Winnipeg River, such as the Dalles 38C reserve.

Shoal Lake is adjacent to the Lake of the Woods and is the source for the City of Winnipeg drinking water via the Greater Winnipeg Water District Aqueduct, so the administration of the lake is a continuing interest of the governments of Winnipeg and Manitoba.

Communities near Lake of the Woods

Ontario
 Northwest Angle 33 First Nation
 Big Grassy First Nation
 French Portage Narrows
 Kenora
 Minaki
 Lake of the Woods
 Anishnaabeg of Naongashiing First Nation
 Naotkamegwanning First Nation
 Sioux Narrows-Nestor Falls
 Obashkaandagaang Bay First Nation
 Niisaachewan Anishinaabe Nation
 Ojibways of Onigaming First Nation
 Rainy River
 Northwest Angle 37 First Nation
 Anishinabe of Wauzhushk Onigum First Nation

Manitoba
 Middlebro
 Buffalo Point First Nation

Minnesota
 Angle Township
 Hackett
 Baudette
 Warroad
 Wheeler's Point

Lands within Lake of the Woods

Aulneau Peninsula
The largest land feature in Lake of the Woods is the Aulneau Peninsula. It is connected to the mainland with a tiny neck of land at its southeast corner, but a canal (Turtle Portage ) was cut through at this point, effectively making the Aulneau an island. The canal has now been filled back in. A manually run portage for small- to medium-sized boats is in its place. It contains within it over eighty lakes, the largest of which is Arrow Lake, with thirteen islands in it.

The Aulneau Peninsula was named after the Jesuit Father Jean-Pierre Aulneau, a French Catholic priest, who was killed by natives on 8 June 1736 on Lake of the Woods. The Catholic Church in Warroad, Minnesota, is named Father Aulneau Memorial Church in his honour.

Other islands
 Big Island
 Bigsby Island
 Brush Island, Minnesota
 Chapel Island An island about 15  km out from Kenora, where a chapel once stood. When the natives would canoe from end to end for purposes of trading, Chapel Island was a rest stop where the white settlers would try to convert the Native population, and offered a refuge in bad weather. The chapel has since burnt down, and little remains.
 Copeland Island, otherwise known as Camp Stephens. A Winnipeg YM-YWCA summer camp.
 Flag Island, Minnesota
 Garden Island, Minnesota
 Little Oak Island, Minnesota
 Magnuson's Island, site of the restored Fort St. Charles
 Massacre Island, Ontario a small island in the middle of the lake, the possible site where twenty French men, as well as a group of Cree traders, were beheaded in the mid 18th century by Sioux. The site is marked by a large wooden cross in the middle of the island. This incident sparked decades of war between the Sioux and the Ojibway, allies of both the French and the Cree.
 Oak Island, Minnesota
 Penasse Island, site of American Point, formerly the most northern post office in the contiguous United States
 Sultana Mine, a mine on an island in the northern area of the lake in the late 1800s, before an accident shut down the mine. Stories about it being haunted by miners exist to this day.

Recreation on Lake of the Woods

Tourism is a large part of the local economy of Lake of the Woods, and there are many recreational opportunities available on the lake and in the surrounding countryside. Much of the lake is fairly remote, but resorts and equipment outfitters offer options for those who do not have access to their own boats and equipment.

Camping

Minnesota's Zippel Bay State Park offers a wide variety of services including campsites, toilet facilities, a marina with access to the Zippel River, and a beach. Minnesota and Ontario both offer state-sanctioned parks and campsites, which can be located through the respective governments. Backcountry campers can locate a prospective campsite on Lake of the Woods by boat, landing and examine the site in person. There is abundant wildlife even on the small islands on the lake.

Numerous marinas and resorts on the lake provide accommodation and dining, houseboat rentals, nautical charts, camping and fishing advice, and knowledge on how to most enjoy the lake.

Fishing

Lake of the Woods is home to walleye, northern pike, perch, sauger, crappie, panfish, smallmouth bass, largemouth bass, lake trout, lake sturgeon, and muskellunge.

Royal Lake of the Woods Yacht Club

Lake of the Woods is also home to the Royal Lake of the Woods Yacht Club.

See also
 List of lakes in Minnesota
 List of lakes in Ontario
 Canada–United States border
 Boundary Commission Trail
 Northwestern point of the Lake of the Woods
 List of areas disputed by Canada and the United States
 Lake Agassiz

References

Further reading
 

 
Canada–United States border
Lakes of Lake of the Woods County, Minnesota
International lakes of North America
Lakes of Kenora District
Lakes of Manitoba
Lakes of Minnesota
Lakes of Rainy River District
Borders of Manitoba
Borders of Ontario
Borders of Minnesota